Billy Tang Hin-Shing (died 2 July 2020) was a Hong Kong film director.

Tang first entered the industry in 1979, working as an assistant director for Asia Television. He was involved in a number of popular productions, including ‘Reincarnated’, ‘Dragon Strikes’ and ‘Agency 24’, and was eventually promoted to director in 1982.

On July 2, 2020, Tang died at age 69.

Filmography
Death Trip (2015)
Devil Touch (2002)
Interactive Murders (2002)
Sharp Guns (2001)
Raped by an Angel 5 : The Final Judgement (2000)
Dial D for Demons (2000)
Casino (1998)
Chinese Midnight Express (1997)
Haunted Karaoke (1997)
Web of Deception (1997)
Sexy and Dangerous (1996)
Street Angels (1996)
Streets of Fury (1996)
Wild (1996)
Those Were the Days... (1995)
Brother of Darkness (1994)
Red to Kill (1994)
Revenge of the Kung Fu Master (1994)
Deadly Desire (1993)
Run and Kill (1993)
Dr. Lamb (1992)
Dragon Fight (1989)

References

External links

HK Cinemagic entry
LoveHKfilm entry

Hong Kong film directors
2020 deaths
Year of birth missing